Ivanno Jeremiah is an English actor known for his role in Humans.

In 2016, he appeared in "Shut Up and Dance", an episode of the anthology series Black Mirror.

Filmography

Film

Television

References

External links

Living people
Black British male actors
British male television actors
Year of birth missing (living people)
Place of birth missing (living people)
21st-century British male actors